Maggaly Nguema (born 1993) is a Gabonese beauty pageant titleholder who was crowned Miss Gabon 2014 and represented Gabon at the Miss Universe 2014.

Early life
Nguema is a 3 BA student at the National Institute of Science and Management (INSG. She also works as a model.

Pageantry

Miss Gabon 2014
Nguema was crowned as the new Miss Gabon 2014. She was crowned by Jennifer Ondo Mouchita, Miss Gabon 2013. She represented the province of the estuary (province de l'Estuaire) and won the Miss Gabon crown on November 30, 2013 in Libreville.

Miss International 2014
Nguema represented Gabon at Miss International 2014 where she competed to succeed the winner of Miss International 2013,  Bea Santiago of the Philippines

Miss Supranational 2014
Nguema represented Gabon at Miss Supranational 2014 where she competed to succeed the current titleholder, Mutya Datul of the Philippines and placed as 2nd runner up. The Miss Supranational 2014 crown was won by Asha Bhat of India.

Miss Universe 2014
Nguema represented Gabon at Miss Universe 2014 where she competed to succeed Miss Universe 2013, Gabriela Isler of Venezuela.

References

Links 
 Official Miss Gabon Facebook

Miss Universe 2014 contestants
1993 births
Miss International 2014 delegates
Living people
Gabonese beauty pageant winners
Miss Supranational contestants